Hystrichis is a genus of nematode worm with a spinose anterior end, resembling the introvert of priapulids. Species of Hystrichis live mainly in the digestive tract of aquatic birds.

References

Ascaridida
Chromadorea genera
Parasitic nematodes
Taxa described in 1845